"Edmund Burke on Croker and Tammany" is an earnest satire by Mark Twain. It was first written for the North American Review, and with their permission was given as a pre-publication address by Twain on October 17, 1901. It was published that same year as a pamphlet under the auspices of a reform committee known as The Order of Acorns. The essay arose from Twain's involvement in a campaign to defeat the Tammany Hall candidate for mayor of New York City. Twain's squib was widely credited with helping to defeat Richard Croker's candidate, Edward M. Shepard.

References 

Essays by Mark Twain
1901 essays
1901 in New York City
October 1901 events
Works originally published in the North American Review
Political history of New York City
Edmund Burke